The Roanoke Valley Rebels were a minor league professional ice hockey team based in the Roanoke Valley in Virginia. The team first played in the Eastern Hockey League and then joined the Southern Hockey League. The team was originally known as the Salem Rebels from 1967 to 1970, playing at the Salem Civic Center in Salem, Virginia. In 1971, the Rebels began splitting home games between Salem at the newer and larger Roanoke Civic Center in Roanoke. 

The team name recalled Johnny Reb, a national personification of the Southern United States. The team logo resembled the Battle Flag of the Confederate States of America. The Rebels were founding members of the Southern Hockey League in 1973 after the Eastern Hockey League ceased operations, and won the James Crockett Cup in 1974. After nine seasons of play, the team ceased operations in 1976.

History
The first Salem Rebels game was played October 24, 1967, and Salem won 3–1 over the Jacksonville Rockets. Most of the players lived in a mobile home park across, near the Lakeside Amusement Park. Dave Lucas was coach the team's first coach, but struggled for the first two seasons and missed the playoffs both years. Colin Kilburn was brought in to coach in 1969, and improved the team to second place in the southern division, but lost in the first round of the playoffs. Kilburn coached the next two seasons to third place finishes, and first round playoff losses. The Rebels affiliated with the Philadelphia Blazers in 1972 and the parent club assigned Gregg Pilling to coach. The Rebels finished first place in the southern division, won two playoff series, and finished runners-up in the 1973 EHL finals. 

In 1973, the Rebels became a charter team in the Southern Hockey League due to travel costs to the multiple northern teams in the EHL for the 1973–74 season. Pilling stayed on as coach and the team roster featured eleven French Canadians, including the league's most valuable player, Claude Piche. The Rebels finished first place in the regular season, and won the James Crocket Cup in the playoffs. Pilling was named the SHL Coach of the Year for 1973–74. Bill Needham coached the 1974–75 season, and the team dropped to fourth place and a first round playoff loss.

Team operator and league commissioner, Gene Hawthorne, filed for bankruptcy protection for the team July 14, 1975, and the Rebels were obtained by local oil distributor, Henry Brabham. Player-coach Jack Chipchase led the Rebels in the 1975–76 season, finishing fourth place, and a first round playoff loss. The Rebels ceased operations after the season. Salem eventually got another team in the Salem Raiders of the restarted Eastern Hockey League in 1980 and the Rebels branding was revived for an East Coast Hockey League team from 1990 to 1992.

Major league affiliations
The Rebels were affiliated with the National Hockey League in the 1971–72 season, and with the World Hockey Association from 1972 to 1976.

Notable players
Notable players for the Salem Rebels (EHL 1967–1970), the Roanoke Valley Rebels (EHL 1970–1973), and the Roanoke Valley Rebels (SHL 1973–1977), who also played in either the National Hockey League or the World Hockey Association.

Randy Andreachuk
Yves Archambault
Ron Ashton
Jamie Bateman
Serge Beaudoin
John Bennett
Michel Boudreau
Brian Bradley
Brian Bye
Rychard Campeau
Mike Chernoff
Jack Chipchase
Howie Colborne
Pete Donnelly
Guy Dufour
George Gardner
Jean-Claude Garneau
Sam Gellard
Merv Haney
Derek Harker
Pierre Henry
Ted Hodgson
Ralph Hopiavuori
Ed Humphreys
Dave Hutchison
Jim Jones
Jimmy Jones
Joe Junkin
Doug Kerslake
Roger Lafreniere
Camille LaPierre
Dave Lucas
Peter McNamee
Denis Meloche
John Migneault
Wayne Mosdell
Murray Myers
Billy Orr
Pierre Paiement
Michel Plante
Jan Popiel
Rich Pumple
Michel Rouleau
Claude St. Sauveur
Dave Schultz
Gord Smith
Danny Sullivan
Jean Tétreault

Results
As recorded in the Internet Hockey Database:

References

External links
 The Eastern Hockey League

1967 establishments in Virginia
1976 disestablishments in Virginia
Calgary Cowboys minor league affiliates
Defunct ice hockey teams in the United States
Eastern Hockey League teams
Houston Aeros minor league affiliates
Ice hockey clubs established in 1967
Ice hockey clubs disestablished in 1976
Ice hockey teams in Virginia
Philadelphia Flyers minor league affiliates
San Diego Mariners minor league affiliates
Southern Hockey League (1973–1977) teams
Sports in Roanoke, Virginia
Sports in Salem, Virginia
Winnipeg Jets minor league affiliates